The VfB Friedberg is a German association football club from the town of Friedberg, Hesse.

In pre-Second World War football the club has played at times at highest level, most notable the six seasons spend in the Gauliga Hessen from 1933 to 1939. In post war play the club spent just one season in the tier two 2. Oberliga Süd in 1958–59. After relegation from the tier three Amateurliga Hessen in 1963 the club permanently disappeared into regional amateur football where it plays today.

History
Formed in 1918, VfB Friedberg first reached the highest level of play in the region in 1922 when it played for a season in the tier one Kreisliga Nordmain, alongside clubs like Eintracht Frankfurt and FSV Frankfurt. Relegated again immediately it returned to top level football in 1932, now to the Bezirksliga Main-Hessen. This league was replaced by the Gauliga Hessen when the Nazis came to power in 1933 and VfB's most successful area began, lasting until the start of the Second World War in 1939. The new league did not include the strong clubs from Frankfurt, instead VfB played against clubs from Kassel and Fulda and finished runners-up in the league in 1934. In 1937 it qualified for the first round of the German Cup, losing 0–2 to SV Waldhof Mannheim, but with the outbreak of the war it had to withdraw from league football.

Post war play saw the club compete in the tier two Landesliga Hessen and, when this league was replaced by the Amateurliga Hessen in 1950, in the latter. The first couple of seasons were spent as a mid-table side but, in 1957, the club finished runners-up and in the season after won the league. VfB won promotion to the 2. Oberliga Süd where it lasted for only one season in 1958–59 before dropping back to the Amateurliga. The next four seasons the club gradually finished lower and lower and was eventually relegated from the league in 1963, making a permanent departure from Hesse's highest league.

Since then the club has played in regional amateur football, nowadays playing in the tier eight Kreisoberliga Friedberg.

Honours
The club's honours:
 Gauliga Hessen
 Runners-up: 1934
 Amateurliga Hessen
 Champions: 1958
 Runners-up: 1957

Recent seasons
The recent season-by-season performance of the club:

With the introduction of the Regionalligas in 1994 and the 3. Liga in 2008 as the new third tier, below the 2. Bundesliga, all leagues below dropped one tier. Alongside the introduction of the 3. Liga in 2008, a number of football leagues in Hesse were renamed, with the Oberliga Hessen renamed to Hessenliga, the Landesliga to Verbandsliga, the Bezirksoberliga to Gruppenliga and the Bezirksliga to Kreisoberliga.

Key

References

External links
 Official team site 
 Das deutsche Fußball-Archiv  Historical German domestic league tables

Football clubs in Germany
Football clubs in Hesse
Association football clubs established in 1918
1918 establishments in Germany